Jean-Alain Tremblay (March 18, 1952 – June 9, 2005) was a writer who lived in the Saguenay–Lac-Saint-Jean region of Quebec, Canada.

The son of Gérard Tremblay and Rita Dufour, he was born Jeannot Tremblay in Alma, Quebec. Tremblay received a bachelor's degree in administration from Laval University. He worked as director of employment development at Chicoutimi for Employment and Immigration Canada and later as director of regional operations for Réseau Emploi-Québec du Saguenay/Lac St-Jean.

This was followed by La grande chamaille, published in 1993. Tremblay also wrote a radio drama Par la bande, broadcast on Radio-Canada in 2001. He published a nine volume collection of short stories based in the Saguenay–Lac-Saint-Jean region: Un lac, un fjord, un fleuve.

Tremblay was president of the Musée Louis-Hémon de Péribonka from 1992 to 1995 and was a founding member of the Association professionnelle des écrivains de la Sagamie Côte-Nord, also serving as its president.

He was married to Manon Brault; the couple had four children.

Tremblay died in Chicoutimi at the age of 53.

References 

1952 births
2005 deaths
Canadian male novelists
Canadian novelists in French
Canadian male short story writers
Canadian short story writers in French
People from Alma, Quebec
Writers from Quebec